Jamie Jones may refer to:

 Jamie Jones (DJ), Welsh DJ, producer and two-time DJ Awards winner
 Jamie Jones (footballer) (born 1989), English professional footballer for Wigan Athletic
 Jamie Jones (snooker player) (born 1988), Welsh professional snooker player from Neath
 Jamie Leigh Jones (born 1985), former employee of KBR
 Jamie Jones, member of the American male R&B and pop group All-4-One

See also
 James Jones (disambiguation)
 Jamie Jones-Buchanan (born 1981), English coach and former professional rugby league footballer